Minuwangoda is a town in Gampaha district, governed by an Urban Council, situated near Negombo, Western Province of Sri Lanka. It is an important junction town, connecting the Negombo to Kandy road (via Veyangoda and Nittambuwa) with the A1/A6 main road from Colombo to Kurunegala. The main bus route 5 from Colombo to Kurunegala passes through the town. The town is also situated near the Bandaranaike International Airport, on the way to Negombo.

Schools
Al Aman Muslim Maha Vidyalaya.
Nalanda (Boys') Central College
Nalanda (Girls') Central College
President's College
Burullapitiya National College
 St. Hugo College, Burullapitiya, Minuwangoda.

Villages in Minuwangoda
Paththanduwana
Yatiyana
Aluthepola
Dewalapola
Boragodawaththa
Ambagahawatta
Kalawana
Nilpanagoda
Weediyawatta
Bulugahamulla
Wegowwa
Hendimahara
Dagonna 
Mademulla
Galloluwa

References

Populated places in Western Province, Sri Lanka